The 1971–72 season was the 26th season in FK Partizan's existence. This article shows player statistics and matches that the club played during the 1971–72 season.

Friendlies

Competitions

Yugoslav First League

Matches

Yugoslav Cup

Borac won on penalties.

See also
 List of FK Partizan seasons

References

External links
 Official website
 Partizanopedia 1971-72  (in Serbian)

FK Partizan seasons
Partizan